Shulme (fl. late 3rd millennium BC) was the third Gutian ruler of the Gutian Dynasty of Sumer mentioned on the Sumerian King List. According to the list, he was the successor of Sarlagab. Elulmesh then succeeded Shulme.

See also

 History of Sumer
 List of Mesopotamian dynasties

References

Sumerian kings
22nd-century BC rulers
Gutian dynasty of Sumer